The leg side, or on side, is defined to be a particular half of the field used to play the sport of cricket. It is the side of the field that corresponds to the batsman's non-dominant hand, from their perspective.

From the point of view of a right-handed batsman facing the bowler, it is the left hand side of the cricket field (being to the bowler's right).  With a left-handed batsman the on side is to the batsman's right (and to the bowler's left).

A cricket field is notionally divided into two halves, by an imaginary line running down the long axis of the pitch. In normal batting stance, the striking batsman stands side on to the bowler. The leg side is the half of the field behind the batsman. The half of the field in front of him is called the off side.

In the picture, the bowler is bowling from the bottom half of the image, the right-handed batsman (S), facing him sideways on, has his legs more on the right side of the picture, the leg-side. If the ball goes down that side of the pitch it will be "on" the batsman's legs, the on side.

The definition is relative to the batsman. If the batsman were to directly face the bowler, the leg side would be:
 on the left side for a right-handed batsman, but
 on the right side for a left-handed batsman.

The leg side is usually less well defended with fielders than the off side, because of the typical line of attack of the bowlers, which is frequently on or outside off stump. This makes it more difficult to hit the ball to the leg side because it involves swinging the bat across the line of the ball, which can lead to mishits and catches.

While the terms "leg side" and "on side" can refer to an entire half of the field, each term is often used to denote only part of this half. When the batsman plays the ball into this half in front of the wicket, it is usually said that the ball has been played to the on side. However, when the ball is played into the region level with or behind the wicket, it is said that the ball has been played to the leg side. The names of fielding positions often include the words "leg" or "on", and they reflect this convention. For example, fine leg is located behind the wicket, whereas mid on is located in front of it. When the batsman steps backwards from his normal batting stance on the crease as the ball is bowled, he is said to be moving towards the leg side.

Comparison with baseball

Since the leg side comprises the half of the field behind the batsman, with a right-handed batsman it is roughly analogous to the half of the baseball field that includes left field and third base. With a left-handed batsman, the leg side is analogous to the half that includes right field and first base. Thus hitting to the leg side is directly visually analogous to "pull" hitting in baseball (though since all fair territory in baseball is forward of the batter, "on" would more exactly match this area of the field).  Conversely, off is analogous to baseball's "opposite-field" hitting.

See also
Cricket terminology
Off side
Fielding (cricket)

Cricket terminology